Andrew Berry may refer to:

 Andrew Berry (biologist) (born 1963), British evolutionary biologist and historian
 Andrew Berry (American football) (born 1987), American football executive
 Andrew C. Berry (1906–1998), American mathematician